Kosit Panpiemras (28 May 1943 – 1 June 2016) was a Thai businessman and politician. He was chairman of Bangkok Bank, a leading Thai commercial bank, between 1999 and 2016. Following the 2006 Thailand coup, he was appointed advisor to the military junta. He previously held a number of cabinet posts under different government administrations.  He died of cancer on 1 June 2016.

Education 
 Saint Gabriel's College
 Faculty of Political Science, Chulalongkorn University
 University of Maryland

Early life and careers 
He began to work as an economist World Bank In Washington, D.C., United States, and later returned to service until receiving the highest position, namely Deputy Secretary-General of the National Economic and Social Development Board (NESDB). He enter politics by accepting the post of Secretary-General of General Suchinda Kraprayoon in 1992 and was appointed Deputy Minister of Agriculture and Cooperatives. In the government of Anand Panyarachun  he was re-appointed Minister of Agriculture and Cooperatives again in the government of anand 1992.

Later in 1994, he was appointed executive director of Bangkok Bank until the year 1995, he was appointed Minister of Industry. In the government of Banharn Silpa-archa instead of Chaiwat Sinsuwong and the Minister of Finance. In the government of General Chavalit Yongchaiyudh instead of Thanong Bidaya. After that, in 1999 he took the position of Executive Chairman of Bangkok Bank.

He returned to politics again in the government of General Surayud Chulanont, taking the position of Deputy Prime Minister And the Minister of Industry and was appointed as Acting Minister of Information and Communication Technology (ICT) in place of Sittichai Phokayudom, who resigned from the case of holding more than 5% of the shares since 30 September 2007.

Kosit was appointed as a senator in 1996.

Died 
He died of cancer on 1 June 2016 at King Chulalongkorn Memorial Hospital at the aged of 73. In the granting royal water a royal representative is General Prem Tinsulanonda, the President of the Privy Council and Statesman.

Honours

Royal decorations
  Order of the White Elephant - Special Class
  Order of the Crown of Thailand - Special Class
  Chakrabarti Mala Medal

References

1943 births
2016 deaths
Kosit Panpiemras
Kosit Panpiemras
Kosit Panpiemras
Kosit Panpiemras
Kosit Panpiemras
Kosit Panpiemras
Kosit Panpiemras